Duncan Alexander McNaughton (April 26, 1877 – November 9, 1962) was an Ontario insurance agent and political figure. He represented Stormont in the Legislative Assembly of Ontario from 1926 to 1934 as a Conservative member.

He was born in Finch, Ontario, the son of F. D. McNaughton, a former county warden. McNaughton was educated at Cornwall, Morrisburg and McGill University. In 1919, he married Mary McDougall. He served as reeve for Finch from 1915 to 1926 and was warden for the United Counties of Stormont, Dundas and Glengarry in 1917. McNaughton was named sheriff and clerk for the County Court in 1943.

References

External links 

Stormont, Dundas and Glengarry : a history, 1784-1945, JG Harkness (1946)

1877 births
1962 deaths
McGill University alumni
People from the United Counties of Stormont, Dundas and Glengarry
Progressive Conservative Party of Ontario MPPs